Simon Cataldo is an American politician who represents the 14th Middlesex District in the Massachusetts House of Representatives. He represents the towns of Concord and Carlisle, and parts of the towns of Acton and Chelmsford.

Early life and career 
Cataldo attended Colorado College and majored in environmental science.

References 

Living people
21st-century American politicians
Democratic Party members of the Massachusetts House of Representatives
Colorado College alumni
University of Virginia School of Law alumni